

The Dolmen of Menga is a megalithic burial mound called a tumulus, a long barrow form of dolmen, dating from 3750–3650 BCE approximately. It is near Antequera, Málaga, Spain.

It is one of the largest known ancient megalithic structures in Europe.

After completion of the chamber (which probably served as a grave for the ruling families) and the path leading into the center, the stone structure was covered with soil and built up into the hill that can be seen today. When the grave was opened and examined in the 19th century, archaeologists found the skeletons of several hundred people inside.

In 2016, the dolmens of Menga, Viera, and El Romeral were all inscribed as a UNESCO World Heritage Site under the name "Antequera Dolmens Site".

Abrigo de Matacabras

The Abrigo (shelter) of Matacabras, located at the foot of the northwest face of the Peña de los Enamorados, is closely linked with the Dolmen of Menga whose central axis points directly to it. The tomb is orientated to the northeast, north of the sunrise on the summer solstice, and is the only known tomb so oriented in Europe in this cultural context.

In 2018, the ATLAS research group from the University of Seville published a study of the high resolution analysis of Abrigo de Matacabras's schematic style cave paintings. The small cave has both visual and symbolic links to the Menga dolmen, establishing landscape relationships that are possibly unique in European prehistory. The results confirmed the Neolithic chronology of the cave “probably, at least, at the beginning of the 4th millennium BC... and its importance as a place of reference for the Neolithic (and possibly even older) population of the region...”

Gallery

See also
 List of megalithic sites
 Antequera Dolmens Site
 Dolmen de Viera
 Dolmen de Soto

References

Dolmens in Spain
Buildings and structures in Antequera
Tourist attractions in Andalusia
World Heritage Sites in Spain
Bronze Age sites in Europe
4th-millennium BC architecture
Archaeological sites in Andalusia